Light of Hope (LoH) is a project that aims to provide e-learning facilities to rural schools in Bangladesh. LoH provides laptops, projectors, audio-visual e-learning materials, and solar energy systems to schools in remote areas, where there is inadequate infrastructure and limited or no electricity. LoH also provides books and education materials to students in those remote areas.

The founders of LoH are BRAC manager Waliullah Bhuiyan and AIUB assistant professors Nasimul Islam Maruf and Asaduzzaman Shoeb. LoH has almost 100 active workers, and has other sub-projects. In 2014, LoH opened its first solar-powered school in Bangladesh.

History

Inspiration 
Back in 2009, Waliullah Bhuiyan was working on a BRAC project in the small village of Patuakhali. Bhuiyan spoke with a group of women about how they make money for living. As there was no electricity in the area, some people from the local market developed ways to harness solar energy for electricity. The village's residents began going to the local market to pay to charge their cell phones. Electricity providers also profited. Some of the women decided to use the idea to earn money. Ambiya Khatun was the pioneer of this idea and applied it. She convinced her husband, who was a rickshaw puller, to start this business by buying a solar-energy system on monthly installments. The business was successful, which encouraged other people got involved, and the area was gradually developed. Bhuiyan was inspired by this improvement.

Bhuiyan made the plan of this project and shared it with his friends, Nasimul Islam Maruf and Asaduzzaman Shoeb. They designed the project, but they did not have enough money to start the project nor any sponsors.

2013 Dell Education Challenge 
Dell issued its second Dell Education Challenge in 2013. The competition mainly focused on social entrepreneurship. It sought to inspire innovative ideas around the world to help solve issues in education, including those identified in a Dell-commissioned poll about new education models. The poll showed that respondents viewed a personalized approach to learning to be effective. More than 400 projects were submitted in the competition, and the winning teams could bring their ideas to fruition.

Bhuiyan, Maruf, and Shoeb shared their plan with their friends and family. As all three are engineers, they started thinking about how they can use the idea practically. In 2013, they were studying in different countries. They discussed joining the competition in a Skype meeting, and later submitted their project. Their idea got third place, and they were invited to Texas. Bhuiyan went to Texas for the final competition. The other participant teams had already taken their project on pilot phase, but Bhuiyan's idea was not in use due to a lack funding. They won third place and received $2500 dollars. After online crowdfunding, they gathered $4500. With a total sum of $7000, they started their pilot project. Their first mission targeted two schools in Chittagong and Kishoregonj, respectively. Today, those two schools are still running their multimedia education. With their project running, they have targeted 4000 schools all over Bangladesh to be multimedia schools.

Poura – The Reader 
LoH launched a project called "Poura – The Reader" for collecting books. The project aimed to help poor children who cannot afford books. The project's team members collected books in different ways, such as collecting book donations (mainly primary-level storybooks) from different schools and universities. They also reached out to people and social organizations, such as Room to Read, for donations. LoH ran its first campaign on AIUB and collected almost 200 books in one day. Due to the campaign's success, LoH wanted to spread the campaign across Bangladesh. They launched a Facebook event for collecting books and sent representatives to different universities to collect books. Organizations including BRAC, Room to Read, and Save the Children donated books. rokomari.com donated 200 books. LoH launched a three-year project aiming to create libraries in 500 schools across the country.

References

Further reading
 
 
 
 
 
 

Educational technology
Organizations promoting literacy